On April 28, 2008, an Israel Defense Forces (IDF) attack took place in close proximity to a Palestinian family in Beit Hanoun. The IDF claimed that Palestinian gunmen they had targeted, were most probably carrying explosives which caused the civilian deaths immediately after its assault while Palestinian residents in Beit Hanoun claimed the explosion was a result of Israeli tank fire.

Five members of the Abu Maateq family (mother and four children) were killed and a militant and farmer were also killed.

The Incident
Early on April 28, Israeli ground forces entered Beit Hanoun, a town near the border of the Gaza Strip to clamp down on militants in the area. During the offensive, a shell from a tank landed through the ceiling of a home, immediately killing the five family members eating breakfast. The child victims were aged one to six. An Israeli military spokesman said the purpose of the operation was to eliminate all snipers, tunnel diggers and Qassam rocket crews in the area. In response to the Israeli incursion, Palestinian militants fired on Israeli troops, slightly wounding one of them. Israeli fighter jets fired on militant positions, causing a massive explosion, apparently from bombs being held by the militants. The IDF claimed the resulting explosion was responsible for the destruction of the nearby house. Palestinian doctors and residents of Beit Hanoun claim Israeli tank fire was the cause of the explosion, however Israel says it was the explosives that the militants were carrying.

In a separate incident in Beit Hanoun, an Islamic Jihad gunmen and a farmer were killed.

Palestinian reaction
Palestinian president Mahmoud Abbas said the incident "does not serve efforts being exerted to achieve calm, and it obstructs the peace process". The husband and father of the family, Ahmad Abu Maataq said, 
I left the house just moments before to look for one of my children. I heard the sound of the explosion, and when I returned to the house I found my wife and my children... I hope to God that the same thing that happened to me happens to whoever fired that missile at my house, that what happened to my wife and children happens to his family

References

Beit Hanoun
Israeli attacks against the Gaza Strip